Jacob F. Shaffer Farm is a historic home and farm complex located at Millers, Carroll County, Maryland. The complex consists of a brick house built in 1854, a rare stone bank barn, a frame summer kitchen, and a frame corn crib. The house is a two-story, three-bay wide, banked Federal / Greek Revival style brick structure with Flemish bond on the east-facing facade.

It was listed on the National Register of Historic Places in 1998.

References

External links
, including photo from 1992, at Maryland Historical Trust

Farms on the National Register of Historic Places in Maryland
Houses in Carroll County, Maryland
Houses completed in 1854
Federal architecture in Maryland
Greek Revival houses in Maryland
National Register of Historic Places in Carroll County, Maryland